The Peacock Inn is a former public house at 11 Islington High Street, London, that dates from 1564.

History
The pub closed in 1962 although the building still stands.

In fiction
The inn features in Tom Brown's Schooldays as the inn at which Tom stays prior to travelling to Rugby School. It is also mentioned in Charles Dickens's Nicholas Nickleby as the place where Nicholas stops on his coach journey to Yorkshire.

References

External links 

Pubs in the London Borough of Islington
History of the London Borough of Islington
1564 establishments in England
Former pubs in London
Buildings and structures in Islington